KEPI (88.7 FM) is a Spanish language Christian radio station licensed to Eagle Pass, Texas.  The station is owned by World Radio Network, Inc.

References

External links
KEPI's official website

EPI
EPI